Route 105 is a collector highway in New Brunswick running from Route 10 in Youngs Cove to Route 108 in Grand Falls, mostly along the east and north banks of the Saint John River, over a distance of . Route 105 consists largely of former alignments of Route 2 (the Trans-Canada Highway) and runs parallel to Route 2 over its entire length.

Since late 2016, a gap has existed on Route 105 since the closure and removal of the old Jemseg River Bridge connecting Jemseg and Coytown. Traffic must use the nearby Route 2 freeway and the newer Jemseg River Bridge to bypass the affected section of Route 105.

Route description 

From Youngs Cove, Route 105 follows a former routing of the Trans-Canada Highway southwest (signed north) along the south shore of Grand Lake to Jemseg.

The Route 105 designation temporarily ends at the intersection with Route 695 in Jemseg due to the closure of the old Jemseg River Bridge. The existing roadway, Marina Drive, terminates at a cul-de-sac just before reaching the river. The same is true approaching the river from the west. Traffic must use the Trans-Canada Highway (Route 2) between exits 333 and 339 to cross the Jemseg River.

The Route 105 designation resumes upon exiting Route 2 at exit 333 near Coytown. From there, the route continues west, following the east bank of the Saint John River, to Fredericton. Within Fredericton, the highway is known as Riverside Drive in the district of Barkers Point and Union Street in Devon. The Nashwaaksis area is bypassed by a four-lane divided expressway known as Ring Road, which connects to the Westmorland Street Bridge.

West of Fredericton, Route 105 continues along the east bank of the river, through Douglas and Keswick Ridge, crossing the Mactaquac Headpond. Between Mactaquac and Nackawic, the road was rerouted after construction of the dam and passes through areas such as Bear Island. The road changes direction to a north-south orientation as the river changes course between Nackawic and Woodstock. The Grafton Bridge, near the junction with Route 585, provides access to the town of Woodstock. Continuing north along the river's east bank, Route 105 passes through Hartland, Florenceville, Bristol, Bath and Perth-Andover. Crossing the Tobique River using the Tobique Narrows Dam, Route 105 passes through several more small farming communities and terminates at Route 108 in Grand Falls.

History 

Route 105 was first numbered in 1965, on a section between Fredericton and Hartland that was formerly known as Route 21. When the Trans-Canada Highway bridge at Florenceville was completed in 1968, Route 2 was rerouted to the other side of the Saint John River and Route 105 was extended north to Perth-Andover. It was further extended north to Grand Falls in 1984, when it replaced Route 125.

With the Trans-Canada Highway project between Fredericton and Moncton completed in 2001, Route 105 was extended eastward from Fredericton as well, taking over the former Route 2 between Fredericton and the Route 10 junction at Youngs Cove.

On May 22, 2015, the Jemseg River Bridge carrying Route 105 over the Jemseg River was closed following an inspection which revealed significant deterioration on the underside of its structure. The bridge was barricaded and traffic was detoured onto Route 2 between exits 333 and 339. There appear to be no plans to replace the bridge, which would cost an estimated $3 million. The end spans of the bridge were removed in late 2016 and cul-de-sacs were constructed at the bridge approaches. Additionally, Route 105 signage was removed from the affected sections of the highway, leaving a  gap in the highway.

Major intersections

References

105
Saint John River (Bay of Fundy)
105
105
105
105
105
105
Former segments of the Trans-Canada Highway